"Celos" ("Jealousy") is a song by Mexican singer-songwriter Daniela Romo. It was released in 1983 as the third single from her self-titled album.

Background
Mexican singer Daniela Romo released her self-titled second studio album with the lead single "Mentiras" ("Lies") in 1983 which became Romo's first number-one single in Mexico. "Celos" was released as the third single from the album and also peaked atop the charts in the country for 32 weeks. "Celos" was awarded a Gold certificacion by the Asociación Mexicana de Productores de Fonogramas y Videogramas.

Fanny Lu version

In 2009, Colombian singer Fanny Lu recorded a cover version of the song, which was included on her second studio album Dos.

Charts

See also
List of number-one hits of 1983 (Mexico)

References

1983 songs
2009 singles
Daniela Romo songs
Fanny Lu songs
Spanish-language songs
Songs written by José Luis Perales
EMI Records singles
Universal Music Latino singles